Floyd Vivino (born October 19, 1951), also known as Uncle Floyd, is an American television, film, and stage performer primarily known for his comedy/variety TV show The Uncle Floyd Show (1974–1998).

Early life
Vivino was born in Paterson, New Jersey to Jerry Vivino Sr., a jazz trumpeter, and Emily Vivino.  He grew up in Paterson, Point Pleasant, Island Heights, and Glen Rock. He attended Glen Rock High School where he produced a musical revue starring the school's janitorial staff.  Floyd began his live performance career working as a child tap dancer in Atlantic City, New Jersey, and began his broadcast career over a friend's pirate radio station while in high school.

Floyd Vivino is the older brother of Jerry Vivino and Jimmy Vivino, who were members of the Basic Cable Band, formerly known as the Max Weinberg 7.  Floyd is also the uncle of musical theater actress Donna Vivino.

Career

The Uncle Floyd Show
The Uncle Floyd Show aired in New Jersey and New York from 1974 to 1998. It can be read as a children's show or a parody of a children's show. Much of the humor has a twist aimed at adults, in the style of shows by predecessor Soupy Sales (1950s-1970s), and later Pee Wee Herman (1980s). The show featured character comedy, puppetry, some audience participation, musical guests, and Floyd's piano playing. One of Floyd's puppet sidekicks – actually a ventriloquial figure – was named Oogie. His on-air interaction with off-camera staff and sidekicks is somewhat in the style of what Howard Stern and Chelsea Handler would later do. Local bands such as The Smithereens, The Shades, and R. Stevie Moore, along with such well-known performers as The Ramones, Tiny Tim, Benny Bell, Bon Jovi, Jan and Dean, Peter Tork, Squeeze, David Johansen, Blue Öyster Cult, Joe Jackson, and Cyndi Lauper also appeared on Floyd's program.

The show made its debut on UA-Columbia Cable TV of New Jersey, now part of Cablevision, on January 29, 1974. Beginning in November 1974 it aired on UHF-TV station WBTB-TV, Newark, broadcasting on channels 68 and 60, which later became WTVG, then WWHT, as the station's ownership changed.

The show's first cast members in 1974 included Pat Cupo, Bob D. Caterino – known for his Groucho Marx skits, and Marc Nathan, the cameraman. Later members were Scott Gordon, Craig "Mugsy" Calam, Richard "Netto" Cornetto, Jim Monaco, Art "Looney Skip" Rooney, Charlie Stoddard, David "Artie Delmar" Burd, and Clark the Wonder Dog. A phonograph album based on the show, The Uncle Floyd Show Album, was released on Mercury Records, and a number of 45 rpm singles on the Bioya label were released around 1979–83. Vivino has also released a few CDs as a solo artist.

In 1982, The Uncle Floyd Show went into a small syndication circuit which included 17 markets, among them WNBC-TV channel 4 in New York, then WTAF-TV channel 29 in Philadelphia, WPWR-TV Channel 60 in Chicago and WSBK-TV Channel 38 in Boston. It aired right after SCTV on WNBC. The national syndication deal was seen as a huge step forward for the show, which up until that point could only be viewed in and around New Jersey and New York City on a single UHF channel and, at times, local cable.

From 1983 to 1986, The Uncle Floyd Show ran on the statewide PBS network, NJN New Jersey Network, which consisted of 4 channels: WNJS (Channel 23, Camden), WNJN (Channel 50, Montclair), WNJB (Channel 58, New Brunswick) and WNJT (Channel 52, Trenton).

Starting in late 1986, The Uncle Floyd Show was then seen on statewide cable channel CTN ("The Cable Television Network Of New Jersey").  During this time, the show went through various incarnations with Floyd sometimes hosting a music-only show, showcasing local bands. Floyd also hosted a show called Uncle Floyd's New Jersey, in which he would visit various towns and businesses in the state.

First-run production of The Uncle Floyd Show ended in 1992, with CTN showing repeats until that channel's demise in 1999.

From 1992 until 1996, cast member Mugsy (real name Craig "CM" Calam) produced and appeared in a spin-off show entitled "The Eleventh Hour."  The show was written and produced in the same vein as The Uncle Floyd Show.  It was broadcast live from studios in Nutley, New Jersey on the statewide CTN cable network, and on two Northern New Jersey public access channels, Cablevision of Oakland and Suburban Cablevision of New Jersey in East Orange (later acquired by Comcast Corporation).
 
In 1998, production of The Uncle Floyd Show began in the Cablevision studio in Oakland, New Jersey. One hundred shows were produced and aired on Cablevision systems throughout the region. Musical guests included Marky Ramone and The Misfits. Although viewer response was enthusiastic, the show was canceled by Cablevision management after the first cycle of episodes.

Other work
Vivino has appeared on several television shows filmed in New York City including Law & Order, 100 Centre Street, and Cosby, and was a regular on the Sirius Satellite Radio program The Wiseguys Show on Raw Dog Comedy (channel 104) hosted by former The Sopranos cast member Vincent Pastore. Vivino performed the jingle of, as well as appeared in the TV commercial for, the frontier-themed amusement park "Wild West City", located in Netcong, New Jersey, a jingle that is still used today by the park. He has also had parts in the movies Good Morning, Vietnam, Crazy People and Mr. Wonderful. He also shot a scene for One-Trick Pony which was deleted. In 2000, Vivino played the bit part of an announcer in the Insane Clown Posse movie, Big Money Hustlas.

From 1987 to 2013, Vivino broadcast on WVIP-FM 93.5 radio from New Rochelle, New York, where he played a wide range of Italian music on his Sunday afternoon program, The Italian-American Serenade. He claims to have the largest collection of Italian records in the world.  The program was revived on sister station WVOX 1460 AM in September 2018.

In 1999, Vivino set a world record for non-stop piano playing, having played for 24 hours and 15 minutes in a charity event to raise money for a sick child. In more than 40 years in show business, Floyd has raised hundreds of thousands of dollars for various charities and causes.

In April 2013, Uncle Floyd's Garage Sale Music began on WVOX 1460 in New Rochelle, the sister station to his former radio outlet, WVIP. This show features an eclectic variety of records from Vivino's large personal collection, most of which he found in thrift shops, yard sales and curbside garbage piles.  The program also features discussion between Vivino and co-host Scott Gordon about the music and artists whose recordings are heard on the show, many of whom Vivino worked with personally during his long career.  There are also segments featuring written comments and questions submitted by listeners.  Beginning in June 2014, a second weekly Garage Sale Music program began airing and streaming on Sundays 9:00-Noon over WFDU 89.1 FM in Teaneck, New Jersey. The WVOX program ended in September 2018, returning to The Italian-American Serenade format.

In January 2013, Vivino began the internet-based radio program The Uncle Floyd Radio Show which can be streamed twice a week from the show's website and through various SHOUTcast mobile apps and links.

Floyd hosted and starred in The Last Authentic American Traveling Burlesque Show, a tribute to the lost entertainment style of burlesque.

Starting in November 2020, Vivino, along with long-time collaborator, Scott Gordon, began live-streaming old episodes and segments from Gordon's archive of 700 hours of video. These can be seen on StageIt on the internet at StageIt.com/SGE-Inc every Tuesday night at 8:00PM Eastern time.

Tributes
The first band to refer to The Uncle Floyd Show in a song was the Johnny Gork Band from Flemington, New Jersey in the early 1980s, released on a 45 rpm single. Johnny and the band appeared on the show, during which Uncle Floyd said he was honored and humbled to have a band produce a record about the show.

David Bowie, a fan of Vivino's television show, recorded the song "Slip Away" on his 2002 album, Heathen, as a tribute. The lyrics mention Uncle Floyd and his puppets "Oogie" and "Bones Boy." When asked how he had learned of the show, Bowie replied "John Lennon told me about it." He has also mentioned Iggy Pop regularly watching the show. While in Berlin in 2002 touring for his Heathen album, Bowie said "This is another new song.  It's about a television hero in America from '70s that myself, and Lennon and Iggy Pop used to watch in the afternoons.  Crazy guy, and we were very addled and used to love fooling around watching this guy Uncle Floyd.  And his song is called "Slip Away."

The song "Work for Food" by Dramarama, on the 1994 album Hi-Fi Sci-Fi features the Uncle Floyd Show in the lyrics. Footage of Uncle Floyd as Cowboy Charlie also appears in the video for the song. The members of Dramarama were from Wayne, New Jersey and made their first television appearance on The Uncle Floyd Show.

The Ramones also recognized The Uncle Floyd Show in their song "It's Not My Place (In the Nine to Five World)", as well as in various live appearances. Also, Ramones guitarist Johnny Ramone could often be seen wearing an Uncle Floyd Show T-shirt in pictures of the band, while Joey Ramone often wore an Uncle Floyd Show button on his leather jacket.

References

External links

unclefloyd.net
officialunclefloyd.com
unclefloydradio.com
garagesalemusic.com

1951 births
Living people
American male television actors
American people of Italian descent
Male actors from New Jersey
Glen Rock High School alumni
People from Glen Rock, New Jersey
People from Wayne, New Jersey
Actors from Paterson, New Jersey